Cymat Technologies is an innovative materials technology company based out of Mississauga, Ontario, Canada, and one of the world leaders in the production of stabilized aluminum foam.

Business 

Cymat Technologies has the worldwide rights, through patents and licenses, to manufacture Stabilized Aluminum Foam (“SAF”).   Cymat is focused on producing SAF for architecture, blast mitigation and automotive industries. The company markets architectural SAF under the Alusion™ trademark and automotive and blast mitigation SAF under the SmartMetal™ trademark.

Cymat Technologies operates out of its manufacturing plant in Toronto, Canada. The plant can manufacture approximately $50 million in stabilized aluminum foam annually.

Process 

As described in the patent originally created by Alcan with parallel patents created by Norsk Hydro, "Stabilized Aluminum Foam" is generated in a continuous casting process via direct shop air injection into a Metal Matrix Composite (MMC) melt. The MMC comprises an Al-Si cast alloy with a volume of particle in suspension. The purpose of the particle is to provide melt stability and must adhere to the following criteria;

 Consist of Alumina, Titanium diboride, Zirconia, Silicon Carbide, Silicon nitride or any solid stabilizer materials
 Must compose of less than 25 vol% of the MMC
 Particulate sizes must range from 0.5 μm – 25 μm, preferably in the range of 1 μm to 20 μm

Though it is a controversial topic, it is widely accepted that the presence of the solid particles aid in the "stabilization" of bubbles. It is thought that particulate aids in foam stability via the following mechanisms:

 Increase bulk liquid viscosity
Slows the flow of molten metal through the cell walls to help maintain a stable structure.

 Creates a mechanical disjoining pressureC. Korner, Foam Formation Mechanisms in Particle Suspensions applied to Metal Foams, September 28, 2007
A repulsive force which helps to maintain the cell wall thickness between two adjacent cells.

 Reduction in Drainage'''
Presence of particulate in the foam helps to impede the flow of molten metal in the direction of gravity by obstructing the cell walls and sustaining the liquid.

The process for the creation of Stabilized Aluminum Foam and can be broken down into these 4 rudimentary steps:

Melting
Air Injection
Casting
Solidification

Once the raw MMC is melted, it is then transferred to the foaming apparatus where gas is injected into the melt and dispersed using either rotating impellers or vibrating nozzles. The bubbles rise to the surface and the resultant metal foam mixture cast will rise out of the foaming apparatus due to its density relative to that of the molten MMC. As the metallic foam is being cast, it is simultaneously drawn off the surface by, for example, a conveyor belt. While it is drawn off, it is then cooled and forms a porous metallic structure.

Major Production Revenue Breakthrough:

Cymat and Alucoil, (multinational worldwide manufacturer of aluminum products) to manufacture aluminum foam panels for EU mandated building exterior cladding;<ref>https://www.newswire.ca/news-releases/cymat-provides-sandwich-panel-development-update-701425821.html

Cymat/Alucoil panels to replace Grenfell Tower-type flammable panels with non-flammable aluminum foam panels. 
For immediate release.

See also 

 Aluminium foam sandwich
 Composite materials
 Metal foam
 Metal matrix composite

External links 

 Official Company Website
 Alusion Website
 Alusion Archdaily Page
 How Stuff Works
 Metallic Foam Casting Routes

References

Scientific organizations based in Canada
Natural Resources Canada
Companies based in Mississauga